Amblyanthopsis is a genus of flowering plants belonging to the family Primulaceae.

Its native range is Himalaya to Assam, Philippines.

Species:
 Amblyanthopsis bhotanica (C.B.Clarke) Mez 
 Amblyanthopsis burmanica Y.H.Tan & H.B.Ding 
 Amblyanthopsis membranacea (Wall. ex A.DC.) Mez 
 Amblyanthopsis philippinensis Mez

References

Primulaceae
Primulaceae genera